Edward Gordon Brewis (13 October 1901 – 4 October 1994) was an Australian rules footballer who played with Carlton in the Victorian Football League (VFL). He also played with Camberwell and Preston in the Victorian Football Association (VFA).

Notes

External links 

Ted Brewis's profile at Blueseum

1901 births
1994 deaths
Carlton Football Club players
Maffra Football Club players
Camberwell Football Club players
Preston Football Club (VFA) players
VFL/AFL players born in England
Australian rules footballers from Victoria (Australia)